

ps-pv
Pseudo-12 
pseudoephedrine (INN)
Pseudofrin
Pseudovent
psilocybine (INN)
Psorcon (Pharmacia & Upjohn Company)
PsoriGel
psyllium hemicellulose (USAN)
Pulmicort (AstraZeneca)
Pulmolite (Pharmalucence)
pulmonol (INN)
Pulmozyme (Genentech)
pumaprazole (INN)
pumitepa (INN)
pumosetrag (INN)
Purge
Purified Cortrophin Gel (Organon International)
Purinethol 
Purinethol (GlaxoSmithKline) 
puromycin (INN)
PVF-K

py

pyl-pyo
Pylori-Chek Breath Test 
Pyocidin 
Pyopen

pyr
pyrantel (INN)
pyrazinamide (INN)
pyricarbate (INN)
Pyridamal 100 
pyridarone (INN)
pyridofylline (INN)
pyridostigmine bromide (INN)
pyridoxine (INN)
pyrimethamine (INN)
pyrimitate (INN)
pyrinoline (INN)
Pyrinyl
pyrithione zinc (INN)
pyrithyldione (INN)
pyritidium bromide (INN)
pyritinol (INN)
pyronaridine (USAN)
pyrophendane (INN)
pyrovalerone (INN)
pyroxamine (INN)
pyrrocaine (INN)
pyrrolifene (INN)
pyrrolnitrin (INN)
pyrvinium chloride (INN)

pyt
pytamine (INN)